Marco Garavaglia (born 3 February 1986, in Milan) is an Italian ice dancer. Early in his career, he competed with Denis Solenghi and Elena Scarpa. With his next partner Camilla Spelta, he placed 14th at the 2006 World Junior Championships and won two silver medals on the ISU Junior Grand Prix circuit. He teamed up with Alessia Aureli in 2007. They are the 2008 Italian bronze medalists.

Programs

With Spelta

Competitive highlights

With Aureli

With Spelta

References

External links 
 
 

Living people
Italian male ice dancers
1986 births
Figure skaters from Milan